"Little Star" is a song recorded by The Elegants. Members Vito Picone and Arthur Venosa co-wrote the lyrics. The music was adapted from "Twinkle, Twinkle, Little Star". When released as a single in 1958, it topped both the R&B Best Sellers list and the Billboard Hot 100; however, it was the only song that ever charted for The Elegants.  Reportedly, the Elegants refused to pay payola to a prominent New York disc jockey, which inhibited air play of their follow up recordings.

Little Star went on to chart at #27 on the pop charts, #2 on rock charts, and #10 on R&B charts.

"Little Star" remains one of the most popular examples of doo-wop music. Phil Spector described it as an "awful good record". Other artists to record this song include Dion, Randy & the Rainbows, The Slades, Vera Lynn, Linda Scott and Bobby Vee.

A small portion of the song was performed by Paul Simon as part of the 1989 Dion song "Written on the Subway Wall."

All-time charts

References in culture 
 The title poem of American poet Mark Halliday's collection Little Star (W. Morrow, 1987) is an homage to this song, The Elegants, and Vito Picone. The poem is also available in Allen Grossman (with Mark Halliday), The Sighted Singer: Two Works on Poetry for Readers and Writers (Johns Hopkins UP, 1992), pages 25–27.
 The song was also used In the pilot episode of HBO series The Sopranos titled "Pilot".

See also
List of Hot 100 number-one singles of 1958 (U.S.)
List of number-one R&B singles of 1958 (U.S.)

References

1958 songs
1958 singles
Linda Scott songs
Billboard Hot 100 number-one singles
Songs based on children's songs

es:Little Star